Otto Wilhelm Thomé (1840–1925) was a German botanist and botanical artist from Cologne, best known for his compendium of botanical illustrations Flora von Deutschland, Österreich und der Schweiz in Wort und Bild für Schule und Haus (Flora of Germany, Austria and Switzerland in Word and Picture for School and Home), the first of 4 volumes with a total of 572 botanical illustrations, published in 1885 in Gera, Germany. Another 8 volumes were added to the set by Walter Migula with the republication in 1903.
From 1897 to 1899, he was the Headmaster of the Business School Cologne.

Illustrations by Thomé

References

External links
 
Flora von Deutschland, Österreich und der Schweiz

19th-century German botanists
Botanical illustrators
1840 births
1925 deaths
19th-century German painters
19th-century German male artists
German male painters
20th-century German painters
20th-century German male artists
Scientists from Cologne